Hickling Mill is a 19th-century grade II* listed windmill in Hickling Heath, Norfolk, England.

Each floor has 4 windows to the four cardinal points of the compass although many are blocked up on the inside, especially on the north face. It is topped by a weatherboarded boat-shaped cap with a petticoat and fan cradle.

The mill was used for grinding wheat for flour and by the 1860s also included a bakery. Production ceased in 1904, at which time the sails and fantail were removed.

After several changes of ownership the mill in 1934 came into the ownership of the Forbes family, who carried out major cap renovation in 1989. Otherwise Hickling Mill is one of the few windmills in the country to have been preserved in a largely unrestored condition. It still contains almost a complete set of main machinery and many of the original timber fittings and three sets of millstones.

Technical Details

The cap is a Norfolk boat shaped type which had an 8 bladed fan and a gallery. The sails consisted of four double shuttered sails, each with 9 bays, controlled by a  diameter brake wheel. They powered 3 pairs of French burr stones, 2 flour mills, a cylinder and a jumper. 3 dressing machines and an oat crusher could also be driven.

References

Industrial buildings completed in the 19th century
Windmills in Norfolk
Tower mills in the United Kingdom
Grade II* listed buildings in Norfolk
Grinding mills in the United Kingdom
Grade II* listed windmills
Hickling, Norfolk